The Unsustainable Lifestyle is the first full-length CD by indie rock band Beauty Pill. It was released in 2004 on Dischord Records.

Track listing
"Goodnight for Real" – 4:48
"Lifeguard in Wintertime" – 4:32
"The Mule on the Plane" – 4:38
"Prison Song" – 3:10
"The Western Prayer" – 3:40
"Won't You Be Mine" – 3:26
"Such Large Portions!" – 4:53
"Nancy Medley, Girl Genius, Age 15" – 5:01
"Quote Devout Unquote" – 5:00
"Drive Down the Cost" – 4:15
"I'm Just Gonna Close My Eyes for a Second" – 3:33
"Terrible Things" – 2:48

References

2004 albums
Beauty Pill albums